Boel Berner (b. 3 August 1945) is a Swedish sociologist, historian, and editor.

Early life and education
Karin Boel Christina Berner was born 3 August 1945 in Helsingborg. She graduated with a bachelor's degree from Lund University in 1967, and a PhD in sociology from Lund University in 1981.

Research and career
Berner became an associate professor in sociology in 1988. She has studied and done research several times in London and Paris. From 1991 she was a professor on the topic of technology and social change at Linköping University. She is a member of the international gender research network Mage, based in Paris. Berner's research has focused on four main areas, using historical analysis and participatory observation and interviews: medical technology and practice; the nature and social role of technical knowledge; gender and technology; and risk and uncertainty. 

She served as editor of the magazine Zenit (1974-85), for Sociological Research (1976–1977), for Acta Sociologica (1980–1981), and for Women's Journal of Science (1981). Berner is a scientific editor of the Pandora series on Arkiv förlag, with a focus on science, technology and medicine in society.

Selected works
Skola, ideologi och samhälle (edited with Staf Callewaert & Henning Silberbrandt, 1977)
Utbildning och arbetsdelning (edited with Staf Callewaert & Henning Silberbrandt, 1979)
Teknikens värld (doctoral thesis, 1981, new edition 2012)
Kunskapens vägar (1989)
Regeln i undantaget. Om olyckor, kunskap och tekniska system (1992)
Från symaskin till cyborg (edited with Elisabeth Sundin, 1996)
Sakernas tillstånd. Kön, klass, teknisk expertis (1996)
Gendered practices. Feminist studies of technology and society (edited 1997)
Perpetuum mobile?Teknikens utmaningar och historiens gång (1999)
Manoeuvering in an Environment of Uncertainty. Structural Change and Social Action in Sub-Saharan Africa (edited with Per Trulsson, 2000)
Suède: l´égalité des sexes en question  (edited with Elisabeth Elgán & Jacqueline Heinen, 2000)
Constructing Risk and Safety in Technological Practice (edited with Jane Summerton, 2003)  
Vem tillhör tekniken? Kunskap och kön i teknikens värld (2003)
Ifrågasättanden. Forskning om genus, teknik och naturvetenskap (2004)
Technology and Medical Practice. Blood, Guts, and Machines (edited with Ericka Johnson, 2010)
Social Science Research 2004-2010. Themes, results and reflections (on nuclear waste issues) (with Britt-Marie Drottz Sjöberg & Einar Holm, 2011)
Vad är tvärvetenskap och hur kan den göras. Erfarenheter från forskningen om teknik och samhälle (2011)
Blodflöden. Blodgivning och blodtransfusion i det svenska samhället (2012)
Knowledge and Evidence. Investigating Technologies in Practice (edited with Corinna Kruse, 2013)
Kön, kropp, materialitet. Perspektiv från fransk genusforskning (edited with Isabelle Dussauge, 2014)
Strange Blood. The Rise and Fall of Lamb Blood Transfusion in 19th Century Medicine and Beyond, transcript Verlag (2020)

References

External links
 Boel Berner, Professor emerita at Linköping University
 Publications for Boel Berner at Linköping University Electronic Press.
 https://www.researchgate.net/profile/Boel_Berner

1945 births
Living people
People from Helsingborg
Swedish sociologists
Swedish women sociologists
20th-century Swedish historians
Swedish editors
Swedish women editors
Academic journal editors
Swedish non-fiction writers
20th-century Swedish women writers
21st-century Swedish writers
21st-century Swedish women writers
Gender studies academics
Lund University alumni
Academic staff of Linköping University